Kafr 'Abbush is a Palestinian town in the Tulkarm Governorate in the northwestern West Bank.  According to the Palestinian Central Bureau of Statistics, Kafr 'Abbush had a population of approximately 1,488 inhabitants in mid-year 2006. 24.8% of the population of Kafr 'Abbush were refugees in 1997. The healthcare facilities for Kafr 'Abbush are based in Kafr 'Abbush, where the facilities are designated as MOH level 2.

History
Archeological findings from Kafr 'Abbush include potsherds from the Byzantine era and two menorahs carved in stone.

Ottoman era
Kafr 'Abbush was incorporated into the Ottoman Empire in 1517 with all of Palestine, and in 1596 it appeared under the name of Abbus in the tax registers as being in the Nahiya of Bani Sa'b, part of Nablus Sanjak. It had a population of 19 Muslim households. The villagers paid a fixed tax rate of 33.3% on various agricultural products, such as  wheat, barley, summer crops, olive trees, goats and/or beehives,  in addition to "occasional revenues" and a press for olive oil or grape syrup; a total of  4,974 akçe.

In 1838, Robinson noted  Kefr 'Abush as a village in Beni Sa'ab district, west of Nablus.

In 1882, the PEF's Survey of Western Palestine (SWP) described  Kafr Abbush as: "a stone village of moderate size, on steep round hill, with a few olives. It is supplied by cisterns. The ground is very rugged near it."

British Mandate era
In the 1922 census of Palestine conducted by the British Mandate authorities, Kafr Abbush had a population of 263 Muslims, increasing in the 1931 census to  360 Muslims, in 63 houses.

In the 1945 statistics  the population of Kafr Abbush was 480 Muslims,  with 4,923  dunams of land  according to an official land and population survey. Of this, 952 dunams were plantations and irrigable land, 1,047 were used for cereals, while 11 dunams were built-up (urban) land.

Jordanian era
In the wake of the 1948 Arab–Israeli War, and after the 1949 Armistice Agreements,  Kafr Abbush came  under Jordanian rule.

In 1961, the population of Kafr Abbush was  704.

Post 1967
Since the Six-Day War in 1967, Kafr Abbush has been under Israeli occupation.

Footnotes

Bibliography

External links
  Welcome To Kafr Abbush
Survey of Western Palestine, Map 11:    IAA, Wikimedia commons

Villages in the West Bank
Tulkarm Governorate
Municipalities of the State of Palestine
Ancient Samaritan settlements